Illilawa is a locality in the central part of the Riverina, in New South Wales, Australia.  It is about 18 kilometres north east of Hay and 48 kilometres south west of Gunbar by road.

Other than private residences and buildings in the area of the small rural population, Illilawa is the site of a disused railway station.

References

Towns in the Riverina
Towns in New South Wales